Take Me Out may refer to:

 Take Me Out (play), a 2002 play by Richard Greenberg
 "Take Me Out" (song), a 2004 song by Franz Ferdinand
 "Take Me Out", a 2010 song by the band Atomic Tom
 "Take Me Out", a 2016 song by the Japanese band Scandal
 "Take Me Out!!", a 2010 song by Fear, and Loathing in Las Vegas from Dance & Scream

TV shows

 Taken Out, an Australian dating game show premiering in 2008 which has produced several international versions under the name Take Me Out
 Take Me Out (Australian game show), an Australian television dating game show that premiered in 2018
 Take Me Out (British game show), a British dating game show hosted by Paddy McGuinness airing on ITV
 Take Me Out Indonesia, an Indonesian dating game show aired by Indosiar
 Take Me Out (Irish game show), an Irish television dating game show airing on TV3
 Take Me Out (Philippine game show), a Filipino television dating game show airing on the GMA Network
 Take Me Out (American game show), an American dating game show airing on Fox
 Take Me Out (Indonesian game show), an Indonesian television dating game show airing on GTV

See also
 Take Me Out to the Ball Game (disambiguation)